Gopalapuram is a prime residential locality in Chennai, Tamil Nadu, India. It is surrounded by Royapettah in the North and East, Mylapore in the South-East, Teynampet in the South and Thousand Lights in the West. It is located in between Dr. Radhakrishnan Salai and Anna Salai. Avvai Shanmugam Road passes through Gopalapuram, dividing it into North Gopalapuram and South Gopalapuram. Gopalapuram comes under Chennai Central Lok Sabha constituency.

Educational institutions

Gopalapuram has many schools which are considered to be the best in Chennai. The educational institutions at Gopalapuram include:

 DAV Girls Senior Secondary School
 DAV Boys Senior Secondary School
 National Public School
 Sri Sarada Secondary School (Affiliated to the CBSE)
 Church Park Convent
 Gopalapuram Boys Higher Secondary School
 Ganapathy Girls Higher Secondary School

Important places

Sri Venugopalaswamy Temple
Residence of the family of DMK leader and former chief minister of Tamil Nadu, Muthuvel Karunanidhi
U.S. Consulate General
Semmozhi Poonga (Literally translated to "Classical Language Park") is a botanical garden in Chennai set up by the horticulture department of the Government of Tamil Nadu. The garden was opened on 24 November 2010 by the then chief Minister Karunanidhi and is the first botanical garden in the city.
Khadi Gramodyog Bhavan

Colleges
Stella Maris College
M.O.P. Vaishnav College for Women

Hospitals
Dr. Agarwal's Eye Hospital
Dr. Mohan’s Diabetes Specialities Centre

Libraries

Easwari Lending Library, oldest in the city of Chennai.

Theaters

SPI Cinemas, popularly known as "Satyam cinemas".

Business
Rane Group headquarters

Gallery

References

Neighbourhoods in Chennai
Cities and towns in Chennai district